Calliostoma hernandezi is a species of sea snail, a marine gastropod mollusk in the family Calliostomatidae.

Description
The size of the shell varies between 12 mm and 28 mm.

Distribution
This species occurs in the Atlantic Ocean between Senegal and Angola.

References

External links
 To Encyclopedia of Life
 To World Register of Marine Species
 

hernandezi
Gastropods described in 1993